Mandisa Radebe professionally known as DBN Gogo, is a South African DJ and music producer. Born Durban and raised in Pretoria, she garnered local attention following release of her debut single "Khuza Gogo", which was certified platinum in South Africa.

Career 
Mandisa Radebe born in Durban, her family relocated to Pretoria where she grew up and spent her childhood. Her father Jeff Radebe is the former minister of energy, and her mother Bridgette Motsepe Radebe businesswoman. Her interest in music began at early age, participating in school choirs.
She studied law at the University of Pretoria.

In April 2020, she was featured on Channel O's Lockdown House Party hosted by Channel 0 and garnered local attention.

Khuza Gogo" featuring Mpura, Ama Avenger, and M.J was released on 19 March 2021. The song was certified platinum by in South Africa.

On 21 August 2021, her first collaborative EP Thokoza Café with DJ Dinho was released

In October 2021, she became the first South African to join Global Equal programme by Spotify.

In 1 February, she was announced as a host of Boiler Room x Ballantine's True Music Studios.
Her record label Zikode Records was established in February 2022, in partnership with Universal Music Group.

In March 2022, she was featured on Spotify Africa Radar programme.

In 24 April, she headlined to Coachella Valley Music and Arts Festival which was held in U.S.

In early November 2022, She announced her debut studio album Whats Real.

The album was released on 25 November 2022.

Discography 
 Break Through (with UNLIMITED Soul)
 Thokoza Café (with Dinho) (2021)
 Whats Real (2022)

Awards

Basadi in Music Awards 

!
|-
|rowspan="2"|2022
|Herself 
|DJ of the Year 
|
|rowspan="2"|
|-
|"Bambelela"
|Song of the Year 
|

Clout Africa awards 

!
|-
|2022
|Herself 
|DJ of the Year
|
|

DStv Mzansi Viewers' Choice Awards 

! 
|-
|rowspan="2"|2022
|rowspan="2"|Herself 
|Favourite DJ
|
|rowspan="2"| 
|-
|Favourite Personality
|

Mzansi Kwaito and House Music Awards 

! 
|-
|rowspan="2"|2021
|Herself 
|Best DJ
|
|rowspan="2"|
|-
|"Khuza Gogo"
|Best AmaPiano Song
|

SA Amapiano Music Awards 

! 
|-
|rowspan="5"|2021
|"Khuza Gogo"
|Amapiano Song of the Year
|
|rowspan="5"|
|-
|rowspan="3"|Herself 
|Amapiano Artist of the Year
|
|-
|Best Female Amapiano Artist
|
|-
|Best Amapiano Female DJ Act
|
|-
|"Dakiwe"
|Most Viral Amapiano Song of the Year
|

References 

Living people
South African record producers
South African DJs
Year of birth missing (living people)